Ethan Christopher Finlay (born August 6, 1990) is an American professional soccer player who plays as a winger for Major League Soccer club Austin FC.

Career

College and amateur

Born in Duluth, Minnesota, Finlay's family moved across the U.S. during his childhood and he grew up in Minnesota, North Carolina and  Wisconsin where he played high school soccer for Marshfield, Wisconsin as well as youth soccer for FC Milwaukee.
Finlay played college soccer at Creighton University between 2008 and 2011. Ethan finished his career in the top 5 all time in Bluejay scoring, and leading the Bluejays to the 2011 NCAA Final Four in Alabama. During his time at Creighton, Finlay was a M.A.C. Hermann Trophy finalist (3), finishing second in the voting for College Soccer's player of the Year award in 2012, the first ever player from Wisconsin to be a finalist for college soccer's most prestigious honor. Finlay was a NSCAA All-American First Team 2011, NSCA Academic National player of the Year 2011, College Soccer News All-American First Team 2011 and was Missouri Valley Conference Player of the Year in 2010 and 2011. Finlay was elected as the Fred Ware Award winner in 2011 as Nebraska's College Athlete of the Year.

Professional
Columbus Crew selected Finlay in the first round (No. 10 overall) of the 2012 MLS SuperDraft. Finlay made his debut during a 2–0 loss at Colorado Rapids, coming on as a first-half substitute for the injured Dilly Duka in the 12th minute on March 10, 2012. Ethan scored his first MLS goal vs the Portland Timbers in a 3–3 tie in May 2014.

Finlay had a breakout year in the 2015 Major League Soccer season, finishing the season with 10 goals and 13 assists

On August 9, 2017, Finlay was traded to Minnesota United in exchange for $100,000 in Targeted Allocation Money for the 2017 Major League Soccer season, $250,000 in Target Allocation Money for the 2018 MLS season and $75,000 in General Allocation Money for the 2018 MLS season.

On December 20, 2021, Finlay signed as a free agent on two-year deal Austin FC.

International
Finlay made his international debut for the United States men's national soccer team on January 31, 2016, in an international friendly against Iceland. In his second game with United States men's national soccer team, Finlay recorded an assist on the USA's game-winning goal against Canada. Finlay was eligible to represent the United States, his country of birth, or Canada, through his Canadian father. He was cap-tied for the United States in the March 29, 2016, qualifier versus Guatemala.

Career statistics

References

External links
 
 

1990 births
Living people
Sportspeople from Duluth, Minnesota
People from Marshfield, Wisconsin
All-American men's college soccer players
American people of Canadian descent
American soccer players
Austin FC players
Creighton Bluejays men's soccer players
Chicago Fire U-23 players
Columbus Crew players
Minnesota United FC players
Association football forwards
Soccer players from Wisconsin
Columbus Crew draft picks
USL League Two players
Major League Soccer players
Major League Soccer All-Stars
United States men's international soccer players